During the existence of the United States Air Force, there have been many plants that have been owned by the service and were operated by private contractors. These facilities were designed so that they would build aircraft parts for the government. Over time, many of the facilities have gone on to be purchased by private operators, although a few still remain in operation as government facilities.

Plants

Air Force Plant 1
Air Force Plant 2
Air Force Plant 3
Air Force Plant 4
Air Force Plant 5
Air Force Plant 6
Air Force Plant 7
Air Force Plant 8
Air Force Plant 9
Air Force Plant 10
Air Force Plant 11
Air Force Plant 12
Air Force Plant 13
Air Force Plant 14
Air Force Plant 15
Air Force Plant 16
Air Force Plant 17
Air Force Plant 18
Air Force Plant 19
Air Force Plant 20
Air Force Plant 21
Air Force Plant 22
Air Force Plant 23
Air Force Plant 24
Air Force Plant 25
Air Force Plant 26
Air Force Plant 27
Air Force Plant 28
Air Force Plant 29
Air Force Plant 30
Air Force Plant 31
Air Force Plant 32
Air Force Plant 33
Air Force Plant 34
Air Force Plant 35
Air Force Plant 36
Air Force Plant 37
Air Force Plant 38
Air Force Plant 39
Air Force Plant 40
Air Force Plant 41
Air Force Plant 42
Air Force Plant 43
Air Force Plant 44
Air Force Plant 45
Air Force Plant 46
Air Force Plant 47
Air Force Plant 48
Air Force Plant 49
Air Force Plant 50
Air Force Plant 51
Air Force Plant 52
Air Force Plant 53
Air Force Plant 54
Air Force Plant 55
Air Force Plant 56
Air Force Plant 57
Air Force Plant 58
Air Force Plant 59
Air Force Plant 60
Air Force Plant 61
Air Force Plant 62
Air Force Plant 63
Air Force Plant 64
Air Force Plant 65
Air Force Plant 66
Air Force Plant 67
Air Force Plant 68
Air Force Plant 69
Air Force Plant 70
Air Force Plant 71
Air Force Plant 72
Air Force Plant 73
Air Force Plant 74
Air Force Plant 75
Air Force Plant 76
Air Force Plant 77
Air Force Plant 78
Air Force Plant 79
Air Force Plant 80
Air Force Plant 81
Air Force Plant 82
Air Force Plant 83
Air Force Plant 84
Air Force Plant 85

See also
List of United States Army Air Force modification centers

External links
List of Air Force Plants
Air Force Plants – GlobalSecurity.org

United States Air Force organization